Aniracetam (brand names Draganon, Sarpul, Ampamet, Memodrin, Referan), also known as N-anisoyl-2-pyrrolidinone, is a racetam which is sold in Europe as a prescription drug. It is not approved by the Food and Drug Administration for use in the United States as a prescription medication or dietary supplement. Despite the FDA's lack of approval, the drug is readily available over-the-counter in the US as a dietary supplement.

Pharmacology 
Aniracetam has been shown to positively modulate the AMPA receptor.

When ingested orally aniracetam is quickly broken down via first pass hepatic metabolism.  The primary metabolites of aniracetam are N-anisoyl-GABA, (70–80%), 2-Pyrrolidinone and p-anisic acid (20–30%).

Plasma concentrations are generally in the 5–15 μg/L range for aniracetam and 5–15 mg/L range for N-anisoyl-GABA, a pharmacologically-active metabolite, during the first few hours after oral administration of the drug. These two plasma species may be measured by liquid chromatography-mass spectrometry.

Synthesis
The drug was first made in the 1970s by Hoffmann-La Roche. Synthesis can be accomplished by reacting 2-pyrrolidone with anisoyl chloride in the presence of triethylamine.

Alternatively, gamma-aminobutyric acid can react with anisoyl chloride. Ring closure can be accomplished in the presence of thionyl chloride.

Legality

Europe  
Aniracetam is available by prescription in Greece (brand names Memodrin and Referan) and Italy (brand name Ampamet), where it is indicated for mental function disorders.

Australia 
Aniracetam is a schedule 4 substance in Australia under the Poisons Standard (February 2020). A schedule 4 substance is classified as "Prescription Only Medicine, or Prescription Animal Remedy – Substances, the use or supply of which should be by or on the order of persons permitted by state or territory legislation to prescribe and should be available from a pharmacist on prescription."

See also 
 AMPA receptor positive allosteric modulator

References 

AMPA receptor positive allosteric modulators
Nootropics
Phenol ethers
Racetams